The 1970 United States Senate election in New Jersey was held on November 3, 1970. Incumbent Democrat Harrison A. Williams defeated Republican nominee Nelson G. Gross with 54.02% of the vote.

Primary elections were held on June 2, 1970. Williams held off a challenge from the Hudson County party organization in the form of State Senator Frank Guarini, while Gross prevailed over two candidates without organizational support.

Democratic primary

Candidates
Frank Joseph Guarini, State Senator from Hudson County
Harrison A. Williams, incumbent United States Senator

Campaign
Guarini ran as the candidate of the powerful Hudson County Democratic machine. As in 1958, the machine hoped to defeat Williams by running up a large margin in Hudson County, which accounted for the majority of the state's Democratic vote. Guarini campaigned on themes that echoed Republican President Richard Nixon's 1968 campaign, calling himself a candidate who would uphold “law and order” and a champion of the “silent majority” and the “forgotten taxpayer." Guarini also emphasized his Italian ancestry.

In a May interview with The New York Times, Williams confessed to past struggles resulting from alcoholism and said that he had been 18 months sober, which prompted Guarini campaign manager Arthur J. Sills to claim the party should not "risk" supporting a former alcoholic. Sills was rebuked by most of the state's Democratic leadership, including former Governor Richard J. Hughes, under whom Sills had served as Attorney General. Hughes praised Williams's "courage," denounced both Sills and Guarini for trying to inject “the meanest kind of issue” into the race and called Guarini “someone who crawled out of the woodwork.” Hughes further suggested Sills, who was confined to a wheelchair with poliomyelitis, “ought to be the last man in the world to hurt anybody with a disease, illness or handicap.”

Of all primary candidates in either party, Williams took the strongest stance against the Vietnam War; he called for unilateral American withdrawal within one year. Guarini also supported withdrawal but contended that the United States should have gone into Vietnam to win instead of “tying the generals' hands.”

Williams had the unified support of organized labor, possibly owing to his position as potential chair of the Senate Committee on Labor and Welfare in the next term.

Results

Williams won the primary easily; he nearly finished even with Guarini in Hudson County.

Republican primary

Candidates
Joseph T. Gavin
Nelson G. Gross, Saddle River attorney, former Chairman of the New Jersey Republican State Committee, and former State Assemblyman
James A. Quaremba, Ridgewood attorney

Declined
Joseph Maraziti, State Senator from Morris County

Campaign
Nelson Gross resigned his position as party chairman on April 9 to enter the race for Senate with the full-backing of Governor William T. Cahill. Cahill's support discouraged any serious contenders from challenging Gross in the primary. Gross also had the support of President Richard Nixon, for whom he had helped secure the Republican nomination in 1968.

Gross was nonetheless privately criticized as a poor choice by some Republicans due to his ongoing investigation by the United States Department of Justice for involvement with a Mafia-backed labor union. The investigation was led by U.S. Attorney Frederick Bernard Lacey, who had been personally recommended to the Nixon administration by Senator Clifford Case. Case and Gross had been on uneven terms since Gross undermined Case's "favorite son" status at the 1968 Republican National Convention by bringing Bergen County delegates into the Nixon column.

On the war issue, Gross advocated for congressional restriction on the American incursion into Cambodia, but withheld calling for unilateral withdrawal, pending a fact-finding trip he pledged to take after the primary. Quaremba defended the Nixon administration's policy.

Quaremba emphasized his Italian ancestry in the campaign.

Joseph Gavin did not campaign actively. He ran only to provide a Senate heading on the ballot line for Assemblyman Walter T. Smith, who was running for the U.S. House of Representatives.

By the end of the campaign, observers said that Gross had an "insurmountable" lead over Quaremba. He largely ignored Quaremba's campaign and spent the final week of the primary filming television ads for the general election.

Results

General election

Candidates
Nelson G. Gross, former Chairman of the New Jersey Republican State Committee and State Assemblyman (Republican)
Joseph F. Job, Bergen County Sheriff (Independent)
Jules Levin (Socialist Labor)
Joseph S. Mans (Independent)
William J. O'Grady (Independent)
Harrison A. Williams, incumbent Senator since 1959 (Democratic)

Campaign

Gross assailed Williams as a "radical liberal" and implied that he was involved in "influence peddling" for having sponsored special bills for about 70 Chinese seamen who jumped ship in the United States.

In mid-October, President Richard Nixon campaigned for Gross as part of a one-day swing through Pennsylvania, Vermont, Wisconsin and New Jersey.

Debates
Williams declined numerous calls for debates.

Endorsements

Polling

Results

References

1970
New Jersey
United States Senate